Temper is a 2018 speculative fiction novel by South African writer Nicky Drayden. It was published by Harper Voyager, an imprint of HarperCollins.

Plot
Temper is set in a village in South Africa. It follows twins namely Kasim and Auben who were born were presumed to be born with different virtues and vices. Six vices for Auben and a vice for Kasim. It is presumed that Kasim should be more prosperous than the latter. As the novel progresses, the twins starts to hear voices in their head which they later discussed to be the voices of the original twin gods; Icy Blue and Grace who had possessed each of the twins. They seek to exorcism but on the long-run, allows the gods to take full possession of their body.

Reception
Publishers Weekly reviewed that the author "takes speculative fiction in an exciting direction with a harrowing and impressive tale of twisted prophecy, identity, and cataclysmic change." Liz Bourke reviewing the book for Tor.com noted that Temper is a "a novel that requires more from its readers than a more conventional SFF novel." due to its complexity. It also received a mixed review from Locus Magazine.

References

2018 fantasy novels
Novels set in South Africa
21st-century South African novels
HarperCollins books